Ahmet Cevdet is a masculine name and may refer to:

 Ahmet Cevat Emre (1876–1961), Turkish journalist and linguist
 Ahmet Cevdet Oran (1862–1935), Turkish journalist
 Ahmed Cevdet Pasha (1822–1895), Ottoman statesman